ASuite is a free open source application launcher for Windows. It can be also used for applications in the PortableApps format and is an integral part of the Lupo PenSuite.

Program usage
In the main window, under the List tab, user can be able to create and manage own customized application list. While Search tab will let you look for item names.

User can add applications to list manually (with Add function or Drag and drop) or using Scan File. ASuite lets you specify the path, what file types you want to scan for and what file types you want to exclude from your scan. 

Other than the main window, user can execute applications from a graphic and skinnable menu Windows XP style. This menu can open it by clicking on ASuite icon in System tray.

Moreover, ASuite opens applications using relative path. So it can work on any storage device, like external hard disks and USB flash drives.

See also
Comparison of application launchers

References

External links

Free software programmed in Delphi
Application launchers
Portable software
Windows-only free software
2005 software
Pascal (programming language) software